Harmah  is a city in Riyadh Province, Saudi Arabia, chaired by Mr. Saud Bin Abdulaziz Almadi. It is considered one of the most important historical cities in Najd. At the 2011 census it had a population of 9,011 people.

City districts
 Al Shamaly  or  * Al Madhi
 Ar Rawdah
 Al Busairah

Climate
Being in the middle of the Arabian desert, Harmah experiences extremely hot summers and relatively cool winters. Humidity is low though throughout the year.

See also 

 List of cities and towns in Saudi Arabia
 Regions of Saudi Arabia

References

External links
 Harmah Official Website
 Harmah Official Forum
 Twitter Official Account

Populated places in Riyadh Province